The 2001 Cincinnati mayoral election took place on November 6, 2001, to elect the Mayor of Cincinnati, Ohio. The election was officially nonpartisan, with the top two candidates from the primary election advancing to the general election, regardless of party.

While the election was nonpartisan, Luken was associated with the Democratic Party and Fuller was affiliated with the Charter Party.

General election

References

Mayoral elections in Cincinnati
2001 Ohio elections
Cincinnati
November 2001 events in the United States